HC Vlci Jablonec nad Nisou is an ice hockey team in Jablonec nad Nisou, Czech Republic. They play in the Czech 2nd league, the third level of Czech ice hockey. The club was promoted to the 2. Liga in 2001, and have been playing in the league ever since.

References

External links
Official site

Ice hockey teams in the Czech Republic
Jablonec nad Nisou District